Fadrique Álvarez de Toledo may refer to:

 Fadrique Álvarez de Toledo, 2nd Duke of Alba (1460-1531)
 Fadrique Álvarez de Toledo, 4th Duke of Alba (1537-1583)
 Fadrique Álvarez de Toledo y Mendoza, Marquis of Villanueva de Valdueza (1580-1634)